Polovinka is a rural locality (a village) in Krasnopolyanskoye Rural Settlement, Nikolsky District, Vologda Oblast, Russia. The population was 14 as of 2002.

Geography 
Polovinka is located 37 km west of Nikolsk (the district's administrative centre) by road. Polezhayevo is the nearest rural locality.

References 

Rural localities in Nikolsky District, Vologda Oblast